Prehospital and Disaster Medicine is a bimonthly peer-reviewed medical journal covering research in the field of emergency medicine, including out-of-hospital and in-hospital emergency medical care, disaster medicine, emergency public health and safety, and disaster mental health and psychosocial support. It was established in 1985 as the  Journal of the World Association for Emergency and Disaster Medicine, obtaining its current title in 1989. It is published Cambridge University Press on behalf of the World Association of Disaster and Emergency Medicine. The editor-in-chief is Samuel J. Stratton (UCLA David Geffen School of Medicine).

Abstracting and indexing
The journal is abstracted and indexed in:
CAB Abstracts
CINAHL
Embase
MEDLINE/PubMed
Science Citation Index Expanded
Scopus
According to the Journal Citation Reports, the journal has a 2018 impact factor of 1.010.

References

External links

Cambridge University Press academic journals
Bimonthly journals
Publications established in 1985
Emergency medicine journals
English-language journals